The Old Jar Craftsman (독짓는 늙은이 - Dokjinneun neulgeuni) aka Old Man Making a Jar is a 1969 South Korean film directed by Choi Ha-won. It was awarded Best Film at the Blue Dragon Film Awards ceremony. The film was selected as the South Korean entry for the Best Foreign Language Film at the 42nd Academy Awards, but was not accepted as a nominee.

Plot
A lonely old man who makes a living as a potter saves the life of a young woman. The two marry and have a son. The woman's old lover finds her, and she runs away with him. The old potter commits suicide. Years later, the woman, now a beggar, returns to her old home and visits her son at the old potter's grave. Based on a novel.

Cast
 Hwang Hae
 Yoon Jeong-hee
 Namkoong Won
 Heo Jang-kang
 Kim Jung-hoon
 Kim Hee-ra
 Kim Jeong-ok
 Choe Bong
 Kim So-jo
 Jeon Shook

See also
 List of submissions to the 42nd Academy Awards for Best Foreign Language Film
 List of South Korean submissions for the Academy Award for Best Foreign Language Film

References

Bibliography

English

Korean
 
 

1969 films
Best Picture Blue Dragon Film Award winners
1960s Korean-language films
South Korean romantic drama films
Films directed by Choi Ha-won